A hand rail may refer to:
 A banister on a stairway
 A handrail on a stairway
 A guard rail for safety or security